Marvin Wilson may refer to:

Marvin Wilson (American football) (born 1998), American football player
Marvin Lee Wilson (1958–2012), American murderer
Marvin R. Wilson (born 1935), American evangelical Biblical scholar

See also
Marvyn Wilson (born 1973), Scottish footballer
Martin Wilson (disambiguation)